The 1912 Michigan gubernatorial election was held on November 5, 1912. Democratic nominee Woodbridge N. Ferris defeated Republican candidate Amos S. Musselman with 35.35% of the vote.

General election

Candidates
Major party candidates
Woodbridge N. Ferris, Democratic
Amos S. Musselman, Republican
Other candidates
L. Whitney Watkins, Progressive
James Hoogerhyde, Socialist
Jefferson D. Leland, Prohibition
Herman Richter, Socialist Labor
Thomas Sunderland, Independent

Results

References

1912
Michigan
Gubernatorial
November 1912 events in the United States